Lauricocha Province is one of 11 provinces of the Huánuco Region in Peru. The capital of the province is Jesús. The province is found at high elevations in the Andes. The population of the province was 19,956 in 2017 and had been declining for many years before that.

Lauricocha province is the source of the Marañon. Lauricocha Lake is the largest of many glacial lakes in the province. The lake and the headwaters of the Lauricocha and Nupe Rivers have been identified as among the sources of the Amazon River. The high, cool climate of the province limits economic activity. Agriculture is mostly pastoral and potatoes are the main crop. The province is popular for hikers and mountain climbers, especially to hike and climb in the Cordillera Huayhuash on the western border of Lauricocha. The major north-south Inca road, the Qhapaq Ňan, which runs from Cuzco to Quito, Ecuador, traverses Lauricocha province and is well-preserved along much of its route in this province.

Location
The province is bordered by the Dos de Mayo Province and the Yarowilca Province in the north, the Huánuco Province and the Ambo Province in the east, the Pasco Region in the south, and the Lima Region and the Ancash Region in the west.

Geography 
The Huayhuash or Waywash mountain range and the Rawra or Raura mountain range form the western border of the province. The highest peak of the province is Yerupaja. Other mountains are listed below:

Climate
Climatic information about Lauricocha province is available for Rondos and San Miguel de Cauri. The climate of Lauricocha is cool and cloudy. At higher elevations, the climate is ET (Alpine tundra).

Political divisions
 
Lauricocha Province is divided into seven districts, each of which is headed by a mayor (alcalde):

Ethnic groups 
The province is inhabited by indigenous citizens of Quechua descent. Spanish, however, is the language which the majority of the population (89.48%) learnt to speak in childhood, 10.36% of the residents started speaking using the Quechua language (2007 Peru Census).

See also

Sources 

Provinces of the Huánuco Region